Do Androids Dream of Electric Sheep? (retrospectively titled Blade Runner: Do Androids Dream of Electric Sheep? in some later printings) is a dystopian science fiction novel by American writer Philip K. Dick, first published in 1968. The novel is set in a post-apocalyptic San Francisco, where Earth's life has been greatly damaged by a nuclear global war, leaving most animal species endangered or extinct. The main plot follows Rick Deckard, a bounty hunter who has to "retire" (i.e. kill) six escaped Nexus-6 model androids, while a secondary plot follows John Isidore, a man of sub-par IQ who aids the fugitive androids.

The book served as the basis for the 1982 film Blade Runner, even though some aspects of the novel were changed, and many elements and themes from it were used in the film's 2017 sequel Blade Runner 2049.

Synopsis

Background and setting
Following a devastating global war in what was then the near future the Earth's radioactively polluted atmosphere leads the United Nations to encourage mass emigrations to off-world colonies to preserve humanity's genetic integrity. Moving away from Earth comes with the incentive of free personal androids: robot servants identical to humans. The Rosen Association manufactures the androids on a colony on Mars, but some androids rebel and escape to Earth, where they hope to remain undetected. American and Soviet police departments remain vigilant and keep android bounty-hunting officers on duty.

On Earth, owning real live animals has become a fashionable status symbol, both because mass extinctions have made authentic animals rare and because of the accompanying cultural push for greater empathy. Poor people can only afford realistic-looking robot imitations of live animals. Rick Deckard, the novel's protagonist, for example, owns an electric black-faced sheep. The trend of increased empathy has coincidentally motivated a new technology-based religion called Mercerism, which uses "empathy boxes" to link users simultaneously to a virtual reality of collective suffering, centered on a martyr-like character, Wilbur Mercer, who eternally climbs up a hill while being hit with crashing stones. Acquiring high-status animal pets and linking in to empathy boxes appear to be the only two ways characters in the story strive for existential fulfilment.

Plot summary
Rick Deckard, a bounty hunter for the San Francisco Police Department, is assigned to "retire" (kill) six androids of the new and highly intelligent Nexus-6 model which have recently escaped from Mars and traveled to Earth. These androids are made of organic matter so similar to a human's that only a posthumous "bone marrow analysis" can independently prove the difference, making them almost impossible to distinguish from real people. Deckard hopes this mission will earn him enough bounty money to buy a live animal to replace his lone electric sheep to comfort his depressed wife Iran. Deckard visits the Rosen Association's headquarters in Seattle to confirm the accuracy of the latest empathy test meant to identify incognito androids. Deckard suspects the test may not be capable of distinguishing the latest Nexus-6 models from genuine human beings, and it appears to give a false positive on his host in Seattle, Rachael Rosen, meaning the police have potentially been executing human beings. The Rosen Association attempts to blackmail Deckard to get him to drop the case, but Deckard retests Rachael and determines that Rachael is, indeed, an android, which she ultimately admits.

Deckard soon meets a Soviet police contact who turns out to be one of the Nexus-6 renegades in disguise. Deckard kills the android, then flies off to kill his next target, an android living in disguise as an opera singer. Meeting her backstage, Deckard attempts to administer the empathy test but she calls the police. Failing to recognize Deckard as a bounty hunter, the cops arrest and detain him at a police station he has never heard of, filled with officers whom he is surprised to have never met. An official named Garland accuses Deckard himself of being an android with implanted memories. After a series of mysterious revelations at the station, Deckard ponders the ethical and philosophical questions his line of work raises regarding android intelligence, empathy and what it means to be human. Garland, pointing a gun at Deckard, then reveals that the entire station is a sham, claiming that both he and Phil Resch, the station's resident bounty hunter, are androids. Resch shoots Garland in the head, escaping with Deckard back to the opera singer, whom Resch brutally kills in cold blood when she implies that he may be an android. Desperate to know the truth, Resch asks Deckard to administer the empathy test on him, which confirms that he is human, if a particularly ruthless one. Deckard then tests himself, confirming that he is human but has a sense of empathy for certain androids.

Deckard is now able to buy his wife Iran an authentic Nubian goat with his commission. Later, his supervisor insists that he visit an abandoned apartment building where the three remaining android fugitives are assumed to be hiding. Experiencing a vision of the prophet-like Mercer confusingly telling him to proceed, despite the immorality of the mission, Deckard calls on Rachael Rosen again since her knowledge of android psychology may aid his investigation. Rachael declines to help, but reluctantly agrees to meet Deckard at a hotel in exchange for him abandoning the case. At the hotel, she reveals that one of the fugitive androids is the same model as her, meaning that he will have to kill an android that looks like her. Despite having initial doubts by Rachael, Rachael and Deckard end up having sex, after which they confess their love for one another. Rachael reveals she has slept with many bounty hunters, having been programmed to do so in order to dissuade them from their missions. Deckard threatens to kill her but holds back at the last moment before he leaves for the abandoned apartment building.

The three remaining Nexus-6 android fugitives plan to outwit Deckard. The building's only other inhabitant, John R. Isidore, a radioactively damaged and intellectually below-average human, attempts to befriend them, but is shocked when they callously torture and mutilate a rare spider he discovers. They all watch a television program which presents definitive evidence that the entire theology of Mercerism is a hoax. Deckard enters the building, experiencing strange, supernatural premonitions of Mercer notifying him of an ambush. When the androids attack him first, Deckard is legally justified as he shoots down all three without testing them beforehand. Isidore is devastated and Deckard is soon rewarded for a record number of Nexus-6 kills in a day. When Deckard returns home, he finds Iran grieving because, while he was away, Rachael Rosen stopped by and killed their goat.

Deckard travels to an uninhabited, obliterated region of Oregon to reflect. He climbs a hill and is hit by falling rocks, when he realizes this is an experience eerily similar to Mercer's martyrdom. He stumbles abruptly upon what he thinks is a real toad (an animal thought to be extinct) but, when he returns home with it, he is crestfallen when Iran discovers it merely is a robot. As he goes to sleep, she prepares to care for the electric toad anyway.

Influence and inspiration
Dick also intentionally imitates noir fiction styles of scene delivery, a hard-boiled investigator dealing coldly with a brutal world full of corruption and stupidity. Another influence on Dick was author Theodore Sturgeon, writer of More Than Human, a surrealistic story of humanity broken into different tiers, one controlling another through telepathic means. A few years after the publication of Do Androids Dream of Electric Sheep?, the author spoke about man's animate creations in a 1972 famous speech: "The Android and the Human":

In the novel, the android antagonists are indeed more human than the human protagonist, intentionally. They are a mirror held up to human action, contrasted with a culture losing its own humanity.

Influence
Do Androids Dream of Electric Sheep? influenced generations of science fiction writers, becoming a founding document of the new wave science fiction movement as well as a basic model for its cyberpunk heirs. It influenced other genres such as SF-based metal from artists such as Rob Zombie and Powerman 5000.

Adaptations

Film

Hampton Fancher and David Peoples wrote a loose cinematic adaptation that became the film Blade Runner, released in 1982, featuring several of the novel's characters. It was directed by Ridley Scott. Following the international success of the film, the title Blade Runner was adopted for some later editions of the novel, although the term itself was not used in the original. This movie led to a sequel in 2017 entitled Blade Runner 2049 which retains many themes of the novel.

Radio
As part of their Dangerous Visions dystopia series in 2014, BBC Radio 4 broadcast a two-part adaptation of the novel. It was produced and directed by Sasha Yevtushenko from an adaption by Jonathan Holloway. It stars James Purefoy as Rick Deckard and Jessica Raine as Rachael Rosen. The episodes were originally broadcast on Sunday 15 June and 22 June 2014.

Audiobook
The novel has been released in audiobook form at least twice. A version was released in 1994 that featured Matthew Modine and Calista Flockhart.

A new audiobook version was released in 2007 by Random House Audio to coincide with the release of Blade Runner: The Final Cut. This version, read by Scott Brick, is unabridged and runs approximately 9.5 hours over eight CDs. This version is a tie-in, using the Blade Runner: The Final Cut film poster and Blade Runner title.

Theater
A stage adaptation of the book, written by Edward Einhorn, ran from November 18 to December 10, 2010, at the 3LD Art & Technology Center in New York and made its West Coast Premiere on September 13, 2013, playing until October 10 at the Sacred Fools Theater Company in Los Angeles.

Comic books
BOOM! Studios published a 24-issue comic book limited series based on Do Androids Dream of Electric Sheep? containing the full text of the novel and illustrated by artist Tony Parker. The comic garnered a nomination for "Best New Series" from the 2010 Eisner Awards. In May 2010, BOOM! Studios began serializing an eight-issue prequel subtitled Dust To Dust, written by Chris Roberson and drawn by Robert Adler. The story takes place in the days immediately after World War Terminus.

Sequels
Three novels intended to serve as sequels to both Do Androids Dream of Electric Sheep? and Blade Runner have been published:
 Blade Runner 2: The Edge of Human (1995)
 Blade Runner 3: Replicant Night (1996)
 Blade Runner 4: Eye and Talon (2000)

These official and authorized sequels were written by Dick's friend K. W. Jeter. They continue the story of Rick Deckard and attempt to reconcile many of the differences between the novel and the 1982 film.

Critical reception
Critical reception of Do Androids Dream of Electric Sheep? has been overshadowed by the popularity of its 1982 film adaptation, Blade Runner. Of those critics who focus on the novel, several nest it predominantly in the history of Philip K. Dick's body of work. In particular, Dick's 1972 speech "The Human and the Android" is cited in this connection. Jill Galvan calls attention to the correspondence between Dick's portrayal of the narrative's dystopian, polluted, man-made setting and the description Dick gives in his speech of the increasingly artificial and potentially sentient or "quasi-alive" environment of his present. Summarizing the essential point of Dick's speech, Galvan argues, "[o]nly by recognizing how [technology] has encroached upon our understanding of 'life' can we come to full terms with the technologies we have produced" (414). As a "bildungsroman of the cybernetic age", Galvan maintains, Do Androids Dream of Electric Sheep? follows one person's gradual acceptance of the new reality. Christopher Palmer emphasizes Dick's speech to bring to attention the increasingly dangerous risk of humans becoming "mechanical". "Androids threaten reduction of what makes life valuable, yet promise expansion or redefinition of it, and so do aliens and gods". Gregg Rickman cites another, earlier, and lesser-known Dick novel that also deals with androids, We Can Build You, asserting that Do Androids Dream of Electric Sheep? can be read as a sequel.

In a departure from the tendency among most critics to examine the novel in relation to Dick's other texts, Klaus Benesch examined Do Androids Dream of Electric Sheep? primarily in connection with Jacques Lacan's essay on the mirror stage. There, Lacan claims that the formation and reassurance of the self depends on the construction of an Other through imagery, beginning with a double as seen in the mirror. The androids, Benesch argues, perform a doubling function similar to the mirror image of the self, but they do this on a social, not individual, scale. Therefore, human anxiety about androids expresses uncertainty about human identity and society. Benesch draws on Kathleen Woodward's emphasis on the body to illustrate the shape of human anxiety about an android Other. Woodward asserts that the debate over distinctions between human and machine usually fails to acknowledge the presence of the body. "If machines are invariably contrived as technological prostheses that are designed to amplify the physical faculties of the body, they are also built, according to this logic, to outdo, to surpass the human in the sphere of physicality altogether".

Sherryl Vint emphasizes the importance of animals for the novel’s exploration of the alienation of humans from their authentic being. In wrestling with his role as a bounty hunter who is supposedly defending society from those who lack empathy, Deckard comes to realize the artificiality of the distinctions that have been used in Western culture to exclude animals and "animalized" humans from ethical consideration. "The central role of animals in Do Androids Dream of Electric Sheep? and the issues of species being that they raise show the need to struggle for a different way of being in the world. This way resists commodification in our relations with one another and with nature to produce a better future, one in which humans might be fully human once again by repairing our social relations with animals and nature."

Awards and honors
 1968Nebula Award nominee
 1998Locus Poll Award, All-Time Best SF Novel before 1990 (Place: 51)

See also

 Biorobotics
 Penfield Mood Organ

References

Further reading

 
 Scott, Ridley (1982). Blade Runner. Warner Brothers.
 The Electric Sheep screensaver software is an homage to Do Androids Dream of Electric Sheep?.
 Do Androids Dream of Electric Sheep? at Worlds Without End
 Philip K. Dick, The Little Black Box, 1964 - a short story depicting Mercerisms origin, published 4 years prior to "Do Androids Dream of Electric Sheep?"

Criticism
 
 
 
 
 
  (Hebrew) Critical analysis of the 2014 edition of Do Androids Dream of Electric Sheep?

External links
 
 
 Complete publication history and cover gallery

1968 American novels
1968 science fiction novels
American bildungsromans
American novels adapted into films
American novels adapted into plays
American philosophical novels
American science fiction novels
Blade Runner (franchise)
Books about emotions
Books about the San Francisco Bay Area
Doubleday (publisher) books
Dystopian novels
Existentialist novels
Fiction about memory erasure and alteration
Fiction set in 1992
Flying cars in fiction
Novels set on Mars
Neo-noir novels
Novels about hyperreality
Novels by Philip K. Dick
Post-apocalyptic novels
Postmodern novels
Religion in science fiction
Novels set in the 1990s
Novels set in one day